Herman Choufoer (6 May 1916 – 1 May 2001) was a Dutch footballer. He played in one match for the Netherlands national football team in 1940.

References

External links
 

1916 births
2001 deaths
Dutch footballers
Netherlands international footballers
Footballers from The Hague
Association football defenders
ADO Den Haag players